Seventh Heaven or De zevende hemel is a 1993 Belgian-Dutch romantic comedy film directed by Jean-Paul Lilienfeld, based on a script by Jean-Paul Lilienfeld translated by Urbanus.

Cast
Urbanus	... 	Samuel
Renée Soutendijk	... 	Charlyne
Hilde Van Mieghem	... 	Micheline
Peter Van den Begin	... 	Claude
Ludo Busschots	... 	Handelsreiziger
Annick Christiaens	... 	Meisje met hond
Chris Corens	... 	Kruidenier
Kitty Courbois	... 	Hotelhoudster
Jean-Paul Lilienfeld	... 	Colombani
Philippe Merchiers	... 	Pinocchio
Ann Petersen	... 	Conciërge
Marijke Pinoy	... 	Receptioniste
Ann Pira	... 	Meisje in bed
Senne Rouffaer	... 	Troyon
Liesa Servranckx	... 	Baby 1
Jan Steen	... 	Werkman
Tom Van Bauwel		
Lucas van den Eijnde		
Loes van den Heuvel	... 	Prostituée
Koen Van Overschelde	... 	Jonge Samuel

External links 
 

1993 films
1990s Dutch-language films
1993 romantic comedy films
Belgian romantic comedy films
Dutch romantic comedy films
Dutch-language Belgian films